Texas Terri (born Terri Laird; April 6, 1955) is an American punk rock singer, songwriter and actress, originally from Austin, Texas, United States.

Texas Terri has been compared to Wendy O. Williams and others by the music press. Like Williams, she has developed a reputation for wild, scantily clad stage antics including regular performances where she would rip off her shirt to only be censored by electrical tape reading 'TXT' (her preferred shortening of her name). She also performed in black underwear, and even on occasion early on completely nude.

Laird grew up in Fort Worth, Texas, and claims to have spent time in front of the mirror practicing to be a rock star from as young as six years old.

In Hollywood, California, in 1984 she formed the rock band The Killer Crows. After their break-up and a three-year break she formed Texas Terri & The Stiff Ones with Don "Demon Boy" Cilurso who became her song writing partner. They released one album in 1998 Eat Shit on the Burning Tree label. Eat Shit has subsequently been re-released twice as Eat Shit +1 and more recently Eat Shit +4, the + number signifying the number of bonus tracks on each re-release. The band achieved a sizable cult status in America and Europe over the course of their six years together.

When Cilurso left the band because of 'personal problems', Texas Terri chose to change the name to 'Texas Terri Bomb!'. Under this name she has released the Your Lips...My Ass! album which was produced by remounted rock producer Jack Douglas, and featured a guest appearance by Wayne Kramer of the MC5 (though she claims she originally wanted Lemmy Kilmister to appear on the track).

She occasionally is an actress and has played in 10 films to date including Hellbent in 2004 as Tattoo Shop Woman.

Sources
 Texas Terri's Myspace page
 Texas Terri's interview with SuicideGirls

External links
Vampire Junkies Featuring Texas Terri - Official Website

Living people
American actresses
Women punk rock singers
1955 births
The Flesh Eaters members
Musicians from Austin, Texas